Jabłonowo-Kąty  is a village in the administrative district of Gmina Sokoły, within Wysokie Mazowieckie County, Podlaskie Voivodeship, in north-eastern Poland. According to the 2011 census, the population was 71.

References

Villages in Wysokie Mazowieckie County